Denis Alekseyevich Kaykov (born 12 August 1997) is a Russian football player. He plays for FC Amkar Perm.

Club career
He made his debut in the Russian Professional Football League for FC Orenburg-2 on 27 July 2017 in a game against FC Chelyabinsk.

He made his Russian Football National League debut for FC Neftekhimik Nizhnekamsk on 13 July 2019 in a game against FC Nizhny Novgorod.

He made his Russian Premier League debut for FC Tambov on 7 March 2021 in a game against FC Dynamo Moscow.

References

External links
 
 
 Profile by Russian Professional Football League

1997 births
Footballers from Moscow
Living people
Russian footballers
Association football defenders
FC Orenburg players
FC Neftekhimik Nizhnekamsk players
FC Tambov players
FC Amkar Perm players
Russian Premier League players
FC Volga Ulyanovsk players